Sporting Clube de Benguela or simply Sporting de Benguela, is an Angolan sports club from the city of Benguela.

History 
The club was founded in 1915, as the 21st affiliate of Sporting Clube de Portugal.

Since independence in 1975, up to 1988, as occurred with all the clubs whose names originated from their former colonial power, Portugal, Sporting de Benguela was renamed as Desportivo de Benguela.

The club is the owner of the Estádio do Arregaça, in the city of Benguela.

The basketball team is a regular participant in the main basketball league whereas the football team remained inactive for many years, due to financial shortages.

In 2018, the football team contested in the Gira Angola, the qualifying tournament for Angola's top division, the Girabola.

League & cup positions

Manager history and performance

Players

2018–2019

1982–1984
As Desportivo de Benguela

External links
 Facebook profile

References

Football clubs in Angola
Sports clubs in Angola